Mercè Durfort i Coll (20 April 1943 – 7 April 2022) was a Spanish biologist and professor. She was a member of Institute for Catalan Studies from 1989 until her death.

References

1943 births
2022 deaths
Spanish biologists
University of Barcelona alumni
Academic staff of the University of Barcelona
Members of the Institute for Catalan Studies
People from Sarthe